Last Day of Summer is a 2009 drama-comedy film written, produced and directed by Vlad Yudin of The Vladar Company, featuring DJ Qualls, Nikki Reed, and William Sadler.

Plot
Gregory (a.k.a. "Joe") (DJ Qualls) is a disturbed fast-food worker, who has reached the end of his mental tether after being tormented and humiliated by his cruel boss, Mr. Crolick (William Sadler). Fed up with Joe’s ineptitude, Crolick fires Joe. Joe soon hatches a deadly plot for revenge and returns to the restaurant only to become side-tracked when he catches the eye of Stefanie (Nikki Reed), a beautiful female patron. However, Joe completely misinterprets his encounter with Stefanie and ends up unintentionally kidnapping her.

Cast
DJ Qualls as Joe/Gregory
Nikki Reed as Stefanie
William Sadler as Mr. Crolick
Joe Van Mater as Fast Food Employee #1
Richard J. Brightman as Car Driver #1
Alek Dykeman as Guy With Sandwich #1

Reception
Critical reception for Last Day of Summer was generally negative, with the film holding a 17% approval rating on Rotten Tomatoes based on six reviews. The New York Times reviewer considered that it "had a chance to be a decent movie, but Vlad Yudin, who directed and wrote it, couldn't resist a potty joke. A long, grating potty joke." A reviewer for The Village Voice felt that the film "promises what it has no intention of delivering".

References

External links

American comedy-drama films
American independent films
2009 films
2009 comedy-drama films
2000s English-language films
2000s American films